USS Fox may refer to the following ships of the United States Navy:

 A schooner Fox was listed as a United States naval vessel in the period 1817–1821, but no information concerning such a ship is contained in the official manuscript records
 , was a schooner commissioned early in 1823
 , was a schooner built in 1859
 , was a torpedo boat commissioned 8 July 1899
 , later AG-85, was commissioned 17 May 1920
 , later CG-33, was commissioned 28 May 1966

See also
 
 , later APD-45
 , the name of more than one United States Navy ship
 , later TCG Burakreis (S 335)

United States Navy ship names